Bombus maxillosus is a species of cuckoo bumblebee found in Austria, the Czech Republic, France, Hungary, Italy, Romania, Slovakia, Spain, and Switzerland. They have also been located in Zanjan where the DNA of these unlikely species are being collected and tested. B. maxillosus is considered a rare species of the cuckoo bumblebee. The B. maxillosus is an open field species and is also sometimes classified as a wood edge species.

Pheromones 
The only known reports of the Bombus maxillosus came from Scandinavian populations. This species was then further studied in Czech Republic. Below is a chart from the marking pheromone study conducted by the Academy of Sciences of the Czech Republic. It is reported that this is the first time B. maxillosus was studied and they found 62 compounds within the labial gland.

References

Bumblebees
Insects described in 1817
Hymenoptera of Europe
Taxa named by Johann Christoph Friedrich Klug